Xylonite may refer to:

Xylonite (plastic), an 1870s brand name for thermoplastic celluloid
SB Xylonite, a Thames barge built in 1926